Whitesboro Independent School District is a public school district based in Whitesboro, Texas (USA).

Located in northwestern Grayson County, the district extends into northeastern portions of Cooke County.

Schools
Hayes Primary (grades K-2)
Whitesboro Intermediate (grades 3-5)
Whitesboro Middle (grades 6-8)
Whitesboro High (grades 9-12)

Achievements 
In 2011, Whitesboro made the football playoffs for the first time since the program started – in 1936, ending an 84-year playoff drought.
Whitesboro's Debate team (established in  2006) has always competed extremely well. In policy debate, they often sweep invitational tournaments. They have qualified three teams for NSDA nationals in the "Lyndon B. Johnson" NSDA district. In 2013 Brady Flanery became the first student from Whitesboro to make it to the state level competition in Lincoln Douglas debate. In 2014 Rebekah Urban was the first student from Whitesboro to place in University Interscholastic League (UIL) extemporaneous speaking. That same year she was the first to qualify and place in UIL Student Congress from Whitesboro. In 2015 a policy team consisting of partners Adam Wilson and Cody Crowe won UIL state for the 3A classification. The following year (2016) the team took home the silver competing in the same competition. Adam has received two bronze and one silver UIL speaking gavels and Cody has received a silver UIL speaking gavel. In Lincoln–Douglas debate, Joe Mason placed 3rd at UIL State in 2016. Other members of the team have qualified for UIL State countless times in CX debate, LD debate, Persuasive & Informative speaking, as well as Congressional Debate.

References

External links
 

School districts in Grayson County, Texas
School districts in Cooke County, Texas